Xuan-Yuan Sword: Han Cloud (Chinese: 軒轅劍之漢之雲) is a 2017 Chinese television series adapted from Xuan-Yuan Sword, a series of role-playing video games developed by Taiwanese company Softstar Entertainment Inc. It stars Zhang Yunlong, Yu Menglong, Guan Xiaotong, Zhang Jianing, Ju Jingyi and Vengo Gao. The series is airing two episodes back-to-back on Dragon TV every Mondays and Tuesdays at 22:00 (CST) starting from 8 August 2017 for 58 episodes.

Synopsis
After the ancient Emperor defeated the demons, the shattered sword was broken into two parts. Two sword spirits were born – Zhaoyun and Muyun. However, due to the chaos caused by the battles, the two brothers were separated due to attack of xiao yue army. Zhaoyun was raised by a group of warriors called Flying Feathers (Fei Yu), in charge of aiding Gongyang Shuo’s quest to expand the kingdom of Yao Han; while Muyun was under the Bronze Bird army (Tongque Zunzhe) of Xiao Yue. The two brothers were reunited in a battle between their kingdoms. When Zhaoyun discovers the truth, he uses their bloodline to save Muyun from danger.

The kind-hearted Zhaoyun was heartbroken to see the people suffering due to war. With the help of Yeyaxi, a princess from a tribe, the two brothers worked together and overcame dangerous and difficult situations. In the end, they found the Emperor sword which symbolizes justice, using it to defeat the cruel and barbaric Chun Yuyue, therefore destroying the Bronze Bird army and bringing peace back to the world.

Cast

Main 
 Zhang Yunlong as Huangfu Zhaoyun / Yanfeng 
One of the two sword spirits; overall leader of the Flying Feathers and head of the Feathers (Yu) faction. He wields Fang Tian Hua Ji, a weapon bearing the mark of a panther with a majestic grandeur that befits its owner. A man who values camaraderie and justice, and fights for the people. He was separated from his mother and brother when he was young and ended up joining the army. Yeyaxi is his one true love and Hengai is his confidante. 
 Yu Menglong as Xu Muyun / the White-clothed reverent (Bai Yi)
One of the two sword spirits; leader of the Bronze Bird. He wields Feng Ri Ming Quan, a sword that can level ten thousand miles. After losing contact with his family, Muyun becomes the disciple of Zhang Han, a Xiao Yue general. He is cold, yet persistent and sincere toward the ones he loved. He is Shang Rui's god-brother and considers him as his only friend. Lanyin is his one true love. 
 Guan Xiaotong as Yeyaxi 
A young woman from Yinzhou. She wields the Yan Shui Ling Yu, which is said that a slight wave can cause a disturbance in heaven and earth. After her tribe is obliterated and her younger brother is forced into slavery, she is put on a pedestal as the princess of Cang Wu kingdom due to her special abilities. She yearns for world peace but has no choice but to face battles. 
 Zhang Jianing as Heng Ai / Sheng'er 
One of the four immortals evolved from a musical instrument (Sheng). She is the owner of Lian Yao Hu, one of the ten great heavenly weapons and a mythical object with the capacity to swallow heaven and earth. Hundreds of years ago, she was tasked to go to the human realm in search for the Xuan Yuan Sword but an incident causes her and Qing'er to separate from each other. Later on, she joins the Winged Tribe as one of the ten flying feathers, where she meets and fell in love with Zhaoyun. She is cold, distant and mysterious due to her identity. 
 Ju Jingyi as Lan Yin
Daughter of Shan Hai World's Ying Long. A gentle mute who serves as one of the handmaidens in Zhang Han's manor. She is Muyun's childhood friend and lover, who died while trying to stop Muyun's sword aura from consuming him. An incident causes her spirit to be trapped within Yeyaxi's Yan Shui Ling Yu. 
Vengo Gao as Shang Rui / the Purple-clothed reverent.
The creator of the Bronze Bird Army, and brother of the Xiao Yue Emperor. He is cold, arrogant and has a talent for manipulation which he uses to further his ambitions; yet possesses a devilish charm that one can't help but to love. He only has eyes for Qing'er who is his one true love. He also cares deeply for Muyun, whom he considers as his god-brother. He was later revealed to be a powerful demon lord that fought against the ancient Emperor who took over the body of Shang Rui years before the start of the story. His goal is to obtain Xuan-Yuan Sword and take over the three realms of earth by using Qing'er, Xu Muyun , and Yanfeng by manipulating them to fulfill his plans.

Supporting

Flying Feathers
Dai Si as Duanmeng
Head of the Flying (Fei) faction, who wields double swords and is skilled in assassination. She was abandoned as a child due to her father's defeat in war, and later adopted by a Yao Han general. Due to her lonely past, she becomes cold and withdrawn. After her adoptive father was accused of treachery, she decided to join the Flying Feathers in order to seek the truth.  She has a one-sided love for Yanfeng 
Li Zonglin as Shangzhang
Duanmeng's younger brother, an innocent and naive man who is very reliant on his sister. He is skilled in constructing magical barriers and the art of invisibility. 
Yan Xi as Tuwei
A mysterious and quiet young man who evolved from a scarecrow and specializes in healing skills. He secretly loves Hengai, who has taken care of him in his original form.    
Gao Taiyu as Youzhao
An arrogant young man with a high sense of proprietary. He is skilled in gunmanship. His only ambition is to avenge his kingdom and eliminate the enemies. 
Wu Xudong as Qiangwu
A loyal man who does not seek fame or power. He is skilled in archery. He is also Yanfeng's best friend. 
Zhu Jiaqi as Zhaoyang
A dependable and warm-hearted swordsman who likes Duanmeng. 
Xu Yang as Zhuli
An intelligent and knowledgeable young man who specializes in the art of traps. 
Zhao Zhenting as Shangheng
A man who is skilled in magical spells and battle alignment.

Bronze Bird Army
Wang Ruizi as Qing'er / the Red-clothed reverent
Heng Ai's sister, an immortal who evolved from a musical instrument (Qing). She comes to the mortal realm with her sister to complete their respective mission, and unexpectedly falls in love at first sight with Shang Rui. Her love for Shang Rui made her abandon her duty and status as an immortal. Unknown to her that Shang Rui did not truly love her and only need her to restore the Xuan-Yuan Sword 
Zhang Junming as Guan Shi / the Yellow-clothed reverent
A crafty and ambitious young man who seeks fame and power. He specializes in the art of disillusionment and reading minds. 
Shan Sihan as Jiuyou / the Green-clothed reverent
A brash and strong man who is skilled in swordsmanship and magical skills. 
Tang Guozhong as Han Long / the Black-clothed reverent 
A bandit who possesses immense strength and lethal attacks, and is skilled in horsemanship.

Others
Winston Chao as Gongyang Shuo
Prime minister of Yao Han kingdom; an intelligent military strategist. 
Lu Xingyu as Duowenshi
Advisor of the Flying Feathers. He is loyal to his country, but can be inflexible and stubborn.
Fu Chengpeng as Yuwen Yi
Prime minister of Xiao Yue kingdom. 
Joe Ma as Zhang Han 
Great general of Xiao Yue kingdom; Muyun's teacher. He died in battle against the Flying Feathers in war.
Kathy Chow as Gu Yuxiang
Elder princess of Cangwu kingdom; Yeyaxi's foster mother.
Fu Tianjiao as Gu Ting
Great general of Cangwu kingdom.
Bobo Gan as Qin'er / Wushan Immortal
One of the four immortals who evolved from a musical instrument (Qin). She breached a heavenly rule and was sent to guard the Wushan Town as a punishment.
Gao Yang as Di'er / Luoshui Immortal
One of the four immortals who evolved from a musical instrument (Dizi). 
He Zhonghua as Xu Zhi
Muyun's foster father. 
Shi Yue An Xi as Duopeng
A parrot who lived in Hengai's Lian Yao Hu. He is said to be very knowledgeable. 
Yang Liu as Rain Girl
One of the demons who lived in Hengai's Lian Yao Hu. 
Liu Zhoucheng as Ma Qi

Soundtrack

Ratings

International broadcast

References

Xuanyuan Jian
Xianxia television series
Chinese television shows based on video games
Dragon Television original programming
2017 Chinese television series debuts
Television series by LeEco
Live action television shows based on video games